The Nick Revell Show was a sitcom originally broadcast on BBC Radio 4's Saturday Night Comedy slot, written by and starring Nick Revell. Two series of six episodes each were made in 1992 and 1993.

The format of the series involved Revell as a struggling writer and the interactions with his friends agent and the talking geraniums (Vince and Alvin) in his flat.
Each show opened with Revell performing a short monologue, which then merged into the sitcom action.

A TV pilot entitled N7 was made (featuring an actor other than Revell playing the central character).  The pilot was not developed into a series.

The radio series is occasionally repeated on BBC Radio 4 Extra.

Plot
Nick's character is a world-class procrastinator with slovenly habits.  Work takes second place to eating at Craig and Shona's cafe, and drinking at the local pub.  Plots range from Nick taking on one of the locals in a fitness test, to Nick travelling to France at Cressida's invitation, unsuspectingly getting involved in a plot to give a rich man a heart attack so his wife can depart with his money.  In series 1 Nick loses one girlfriend because of his habits, and in series 2 he meets a new paramour who actually understands his talking geraniums.  He also miraculously lands a contract with an American studio.

Main cast
 Nick Revell as Nick
 Caroline Gruber as Cressida, Nick's agent.
 Doon Mackichan as Shona, the Dundonian co-owner of the local cafe.
 Alistair McGowan as Craig, Shona's Dundonian partner who hated Dundee United F.C.
 Brian Johnston and Brian Bowles as Vince & Alvin, Nick's geraniums.

External links

BBC Radio comedy programmes
1992 radio programme debuts